The Mãe Bonifácia State Park is a state park in the city of Cuiabá, Mato Grosso, Brazil.
It is a city park with nature trails, jogging trails, a playground and picnic areas. The park is heavily used, and has some environmental problems.

Location

The Mãe Bonifácia State Park is in the Duque de Caxias neighborhood of Cuiabá, the state capital of Mato Grosso.
The trees are mostly typical of the cerrado.
There are some white-headed marmosets (Callithrix geoffroyi) and other small primates in the park.

The park is a popular place for residents of Cuiabá or tourists to relax with their children.
There are paved and sand trails for exercise, with physical exercise equipment, a playground, a lookout that gives a 360o view of the city, and wildlife and flora trails.
The park can be visited free of charge from 5:30 am to 6:00 pm daily.
It gets about 600 visitors per day, rising to 3,000 on weekends.

History

The park contains a statue of Mãe Bonifácia, after whom it is named.
She is said to have been a black healer who lived in Cuiabá near the park at the turn of the 19th century, and helped escaped slaves to avoid the men hired to recapture them.
At that time the park area was dense forest, and contained a quilombo, a settlement of former slaves.
There are few if any written records of Mãe Bonifácia's life, so almost all that is known comes from oral tradition.
Some historians question whether she existed.

The Mãe Bonifácia Park was created by decree 1.470 of 2000.
It was inaugurated in December 2000 by state governor Dante Martins de Oliveira.
It is administered by the Secretary of State for the Environment (SEMA).
It was re-categorized as a state park by decree 722 of 2011.
As a result it should be fully protected, with a natural area largely unchanged by human action, used for scientific, cultural, scenic, educational and recreational purposes, with only indirect use of its resources.
A management plan was published in 2013, with an executive summary dated 22 November 2013, which makes recommendations for land use and ways to reduce environmental damage.

Issues

As of 2011 the region around the park did not have a sewage collection system, apart from a few condominiums that have their own arrangements.
Sewage is washed into the nearest streams including the Córrego Mãe Bonifácia, which runs through the park and causes an unpleasant odor.
Other problems include trash, environmental damage due to the large numbers of visitors, destruction of the riparian forest and the presence of exotic species.
Since the park is isolated, some native species may not be viable.

Notes

Sources

State parks of Brazil
Protected areas established in 2000
2000 establishments in Brazil
Protected areas of Mato Grosso